Marvin Angulo Borbón  (born 30 September 1986) is a Costa Rican professional footballer who currently plays for Deportivo Saprissa.

Club career
On 1 October 2009 it was thought he will join the Melbourne Victory from CS Herediano as an injury replacement player for Billy Celeski. The deal was agreed in principle on 21 September 2009.  However, he was yet to gain clearance from FIFA, and was unable to take the field for Melbourne Victory until the 10 January 2010 fixture against the Newcastle Jets.

He was released by Melbourne Victory during the 10/11 off-season and returned to Herediano, despite rumours of Melbourne wanting to extend his loan.

International career
Angulo has made two appearances for the Costa Rica national football team, his debut coming in a friendly against Peru on 22 August 2007. In January 2008 he played his second and final international against Sweden.

Transfer Rumors
Angulo has been linked to a transfer from this current club Saprissa to the Major League Soccer team Portland Timbers

Honours

Herediano
 Liga FPD: Clausura 2012

Saprissa
 Liga FPD: Clausura 2014, Apertura 2014, Apertura 2015, Apertura 2016, Clausura 2018, Clausura 2020, Clausura 2021
 CONCACAF League: 2019

Individual
 Liga FPD Player of the Year: Apertura 2007, Apertura 2015, Apertura 2016

References

External links
 
 Melbourne Victory profile
  Profile at Nacion

1986 births
Living people
People from Heredia (canton)
Association football midfielders
Costa Rican footballers
Costa Rica international footballers
C.S. Herediano footballers
Melbourne Victory FC players
Deportivo Saprissa players
A-League Men players
Costa Rican expatriate footballers
Expatriate soccer players in Australia
2015 CONCACAF Gold Cup players
2017 Copa Centroamericana players